Taktika noja is the eighth album of the Croatian rock band Aerodrom, released through Menart Records on 3 December 2012. The album debuted at #23 on the official Croatian Top 40 chart and peaked at #13 in the next week. Two new members performed on the record, guitarist Ivan Havidić (also performed on live album Hitovi i legende) and drummer Damir Medić. Seven singles were released from this album, "Loše volje", "Ostani", "Duh je nestao", which peaked at #8 on the national Top 20 singles chart, "Dovela si me u red", "Široko ti bilo polje", which debuted at #5 of the newly established national HR Top 40 singles chart, "Teška vibra", which debuted at #38 and peaked at #9 and "Mila Moja", which was released in May 2014 and peaked on Top 40 list at #14.

Track listing
All music and lyrics written by Jurica Pađen, all arrangements by Aerodrom.

Charts

Album charts

Singles charts

Personnel 
Aerodrom
Jurica Pađen – Guitars, lead vocals
Tomislav Šojat – Bass, backup vocals
Ivan Havidić – Guitars, backup vocals
Damir Medić – Drums, percussions, backup vocals

Additional musicians
Fedor Boić – Keyboards
Zlatan Došlić – Keyboards in track 12
Davor Rodik – Pedal steel guitar in track 2
Mario Rucner – Viola in track 6
Ana Šuto, Lara Antić, Hrvoje Prskalo – Backup vocals

Artwork
Ljubo Zdjelarević – Photography and design
Tomislav Tomić – Illustration

Production
Jurica Pađen – Producer
Tomislav Šojat – Producer
Hrvoje Prskalo – Coproducer
Recorded by Hrvoje Prskalo

References

External links
 Official Youtube channel

Aerodrom (band) albums
2012 albums
Menart Records albums